The Thornton House is a historic house at 1420 West 15th Street in Little Rock, Arkansas.  It is a two-story wood frame American Foursquare house, with a dormered hip roof, weatherboard siding, and single-story porch across the front.  Its roof and dormer have exposed rafter ends in the Craftsman style, and the porch is supported by fluted square columns, with spindled balustrades between.  The oldest portion of the house is a small cottage, built about 1896 and subsequently enlarged several times.  It is prominent as the home in the early 20th century of Dr. John Thornton, a prominent African-American physician, and also briefly of Charlotte E. Stephens, the city's first African-American teacher.

The house was listed on the National Register of Historic Places in 1999.

See also
National Register of Historic Places listings in Little Rock, Arkansas

References

National Register of Historic Places in Little Rock, Arkansas
Houses on the National Register of Historic Places in Arkansas
Houses completed in 1906
Houses in Little Rock, Arkansas
1906 establishments in Arkansas